Sonia Chocrón (born 17 March 1961 in Caracas) is a Venezuelan poet, novelist, screenwriter and playwright of Sephardic origin. She is related to the Venezuelan dramatist Isaac Chocrón.

Born in a Moroccan Jewish family, she completed her Social Communication degree at the Andrés Bello Catholic University. In 1982 she entered the Workshop of Poetry of the Rómulo Gallegos Center for Latin American Studies. In 1988 she was selected to participate in the Workshop "The Argument of Fiction" taught by Gabriel García Márquez at the School of Cinema located in San Antonio de los Baños, Cuba. After that, she traveled to Mexico invited by the Nobel Prize Academy to found the Gabriel García Márquez Cinematographic Bureau. Her literary work, as well as her scripts for cinema and television, have awarded her prizes and accolades at a local and international level.

Published works 
Her literary works have been published in diverse essays and anthologies in Europe, Latin America, and United States, among others. 
 Bruxa/Toledana. (2019). Editorial Kalathos España.Poetry
 Muela/Molar. (2015). Tale.   
 Mary Poppins y otros poemas (2015) Lugar Común Editores. Poetry
 La Dama Oscura (2014) Ediciones B./ Sudaquia Editores, N.Y. Novel
 Sábanas Negras (2013). Ediciones B. Novel
 Las Mujeres de Houdini (2012). Bruguera. Novel 
 Poesía Re-Unida (2010). Bid and Co Editores. Poetry
 La virgen del baño turco y otros cuentos falaces (2008). Ediciones B. Tale
 Falsas apariencias (2004). Editorial Alfaguara.Tale 
 La buena hora (2002). Monteávila Editores. Poetry
 Púrpura (1998). Editorial la Liebre Libre. Poetry 
 Toledana (1992). Monteávila Editores Poetry
 Hermana pequeña (2020). Editorial Eclepsidra

Scripts for cinema and TV 
 Original script for the feature film "Oro Diablo". 2000.
 Co-Writer for the documentary film "The Lost Key". 2014.

Scripts for Theatre 
 Ni un Pelo de Tontas. 2015 
 La Reina y yo. 2015

Prizes received 
 First finalist, Fundarte Prize of Poetry, 1991.
 First finalist, José Antonio Pérez Bonalde International Prize of Poetry, 1996.
 Mention of Honour for the collection of poems La Buena Hora, Literary Biennial José Rafael Pocaterra, 1996.
 Winner, Annual Tales Contest of the newspaper El Nacional for the tale La Señora Hyde, 2000.

References 

Living people
People from Caracas
Venezuelan Sephardi Jews
1961 births
20th-century Venezuelan poets
Jewish poets
Venezuelan people of Moroccan-Jewish descent
Venezuelan novelists
21st-century Venezuelan poets
Venezuelan women poets
20th-century Venezuelan women writers
21st-century Venezuelan women writers
21st-century Venezuelan writers